Sybaris nigrifinis, is a species of blister beetle found in India and Sri Lanka.

Description
Body length is about 10.7 to 14.1 mm. Head with coarse deep and dense punctures. Eyes moderately large. Pubescence short and dense. Pronotum with moderately coarse, sparse punctures. Elytra brownish, with a black band found at the apex. Legs black except femora base. Ventrum brownish with short pubescence. Ventral side of the front tibiae covered with golden pubescence. Male has broadly moderately and deeply emarginate sixth visible abdominal sternum, in which female is feebly emarginate.

References 

Meloidae
Insects of Sri Lanka
Insects of India
Insects described in 1858